Gilbert Kennedy may refer to:

Gilbert Kennedy, 3rd Earl of Cassilis (1515–1558), Scottish landowner, soldier, politician and judge; served as Treasurer of Scotland
Gilbert Kennedy, 1st Lord Kennedy (1405–1489), Scottish lord
Gilbert Kennedy, 4th Earl of Cassilis (c. 1541–1576), Scottish peer
Gilbert Kennedy, 2nd Earl of Cassilis (died 1527), British peer
Gilbert Kennedy (rower) (1866–1921), English rower
Gilbert G. Kennedy (1844–1909), Scottish amateur sportsman